Cerva is a village and comune in the province of Catanzaro, in the Calabria region of southern Italy.

Notes and references

Cities and towns in Calabria